A prison riot is an act of concerted defiance or disorder by a group of prisoners against the prison administrators, prison officers, or other groups of prisoners.

Prison riots have not been the subject of many academic studies or research inquiries. The analyses that do exist tend to emphasize a connection between prison conditions (such as prison overcrowding) and riots, or discuss the dynamics of the modern prison riot. In addition, a large proportion of academic studies concentrate on specific cases of prison riots. Other recent research analyzes and examines prison strikes and reports of contention with inmate workers.

Prison conditions 
In the late 20th century, the analyses and conclusions presented to account for prison disturbances and riots began to shift and change based upon new studies and research. Initially, prison riots were considered irrational actions on the behalf of the prisoners. Nevertheless, there has been a shift in the form of explanation as external conditions like overcrowding are promoted by authorities as possible sources of causation.

List of notable prison riots 
The list does not include prisoner-of-war camps.

Gulag uprisings

 Norilsk uprising, May 1953 – strike
 Vorkuta uprising, July 1953 – 66 killed
 Kengir uprising, May 1954 – 37 killed (Official Soviet figure), 500–700 killed (Prisoner provided figure)

See also
 Prison escape
 Walpole prison strike

Notes

Penal imprisonment
Riots
Prison-related crime